In enzymology, a xylosylprotein 4-beta-galactosyltransferase is an enzyme that catalyzes the chemical reaction

UDP-galactose + O-beta-D-xylosylprotein  UDP + 4-beta-D-galactosyl-O-beta-D-xylosylprotein

Thus, the two substrates of this enzyme are UDP-galactose and O-beta-D-xylosylprotein, whereas its two products are UDP and 4-beta-D-galactosyl-O-beta-D-xylosylprotein.

This enzyme belongs to the family of glycosyltransferases, specifically the hexosyltransferases.  The systematic name of this enzyme class is UDP-galactose:O-beta-D-xylosylprotein 4-beta-D-galactosyltransferase. Other names in common use include UDP-D-galactose:D-xylose galactosyltransferase, UDP-D-galactose:xylose galactosyltransferase, galactosyltransferase I, and uridine diphosphogalactose-xylose galactosyltransferase.  This enzyme participates in chondroitin sulfate biosynthesis and glycan structures - biosynthesis 1.  It employs one cofactor, manganese.

References

 
 

EC 2.4.1
Manganese enzymes
Enzymes of unknown structure